In number theory, the sum of two squares theorem relates the prime decomposition of any integer  to whether it can be written as a sum of two squares, such that  for some integers , .

An integer greater than one can be written as a sum of two squares if and only if its prime decomposition contains no factor , where prime  and k is odd.

In writing a number as a sum of two squares, it is allowed for one of the squares to be zero, or for both of them to be equal to each other, so all squares and all doubles of squares are included in the numbers that can be represented in this way. This theorem supplements Fermat's theorem on sums of two squares which says when a prime number can be written as a sum of two squares, in that it also covers the case for composite numbers.

A number may have multiple representations as a sum of two squares, counted by the sum of squares function; for instance, every Pythagorean triple  gives a second representation for  beyond the trivial representation .

Examples
The prime decomposition of the number 2450 is given by 2450 = 257. Of the primes occurring in this decomposition, 2, 5, and 7, only 7 is congruent to 3 modulo 4. Its exponent in the decomposition, 2, is even. Therefore, the theorem states that it is expressible as the sum of two squares. Indeed, .

The prime decomposition of the number 3430 is 257. This time, the exponent of 7 in the decomposition is 3, an odd number. So 3430 cannot be written as the sum of two squares.

Representable numbers
The numbers that can be represented as the sums of two squares form the integer sequences
0, 1, 2, 4, 5, 8, 9, 10, 13, 16, 17, 18, 20, 25, 26, 29, 32, ...
They form the set of all norms of Gaussian integers; their square roots form the set of all lengths of line segments between pairs of points in the two-dimensional integer lattice.

The product of any two representable numbers is another representable number. Its representation can be derived from representations of its two factors, using the Brahmagupta–Fibonacci identity.

See also 
 Legendre's three-square theorem
 Lagrange's four-square theorem
 Sum of squares function

References

Additive number theory
Squares in number theory
Theorems in number theory